Highway 1 was an Internet Service Provider (ISPs) in Australia., established in 1994. In 2012, following the acquisition and integration of Global Dial, Highway 1 was renamed to ZettaNet Pty Ltd.

History
1994
Highway 1 established as an Internet Service Provider (ISP) based in Perth, Western Australia.

1997
Commencement of 56K Dialup services
Acquired Perth Internet Services Provider IAP, divesting IAP's Kalgoorlie based assets to Gold.net.au.

2000
Commencement of ADSL services

2007
Introduction of Naked DSL services through the use of Optus Unbundled Local Loop Technology.
Highway 1 acquired by ZettaServe Pty Ltd. Board and management are replaced. The company continues to operate as a standalone entity.

2009
Highway 1 is selected by the Department of Broadband, Communications and the Digital Economy to participate the ISP Live Filtering Trial.

2010
1-Jan-2010 - Acquired web hosting company APIIX.
1-Jan-2010 - Acquired VOIP and softPBX company Simtex.
1-May-2010 - Acquired DSL provider Worldwide Internet.
1-Jul-2010 - Acquired DSL provider EON Technology.
1-Jul-2010 - Acquired DSL provider Nerdnet Internet.
1-Nov-2010 - Acquired DSL provider Global Dial.

2012
1-August-2012 - Highway 1 was renamed ZettaNet.

References

External links 

 Highway 1's official site
Naked ISPs in Australia

Companies based in Perth, Western Australia
Telecommunications companies established in 1994
Internet service providers of Australia